Viktoriia Shynkarenko (born ) is a retired Ukrainian individual and group rhythmic gymnast.

Career 
She represented her nation at international competitions. She competed at world championships, including at the 2011 World Championships, where Team Ukraine won bronze.
She also competed at the 2012 European Championships where she finished 19th in the individual all-around.
She completed her career in 2014 season.

References

External links
Profile at the Federation internationale de gymnastique

1995 births
Living people
Ukrainian rhythmic gymnasts
Place of birth missing (living people)
Gymnasts at the 2010 Summer Youth Olympics
Medalists at the Rhythmic Gymnastics World Championships
21st-century Ukrainian women